Irajá is a neighborhood of middle class and lower middle in the North Zone of Rio de Janeiro, Brazil. The neighborhood is divided by Brazil Avenue. Today it is a neighborhood of medium size, with a little more than 100,000 inhabitants.

History

The word "irajá," said Teodoro Sampaio Fernandes, considered the outstanding Brazilian knowledgeable of Indian Affairs, author of Tupi in the national geography is "honey flows", so called by Indians "Mudur," who inhabited the land.

The neighborhood had its origins mostly Sesmaria of Rio de Janeiro, which was from Benfica, through Anchieta, to Campo Grande, Rio de Janeiro. This was received by Antoine de France in 1568, where he founded the Engine of Our Lady of Help. One of the first owners of land was the Rev. Antonio Martins Loureiro, founder of the Candelaria Church which received them on April 2, 1613. In turn, Gaspar da Costa in 1613, was responsible for building the Baroque Chapel of Irajá.

The son of Gaspar, on December 30, 1644, established the Parish of Our Lady of the Presentation of Irajá and later became its first vicar. The parish was to become the Mother Church of the district, confirmed by charter of D.João IV on 10 February 1647.

In 1625, the so-called field Irajá has also been recognized as belonging to the City Council. 
In 1775, there were thirteen mills in the region.

During the 17th century, Irajá was an important supply center for food and building material. What can be considered as a tradition of the local market for housing for several years the cement factory and white Irajazinho CEASA important supply center for groceries.

Like other land grants, to the Irajá was broken, shaping the map of the city we know today. 
Currently, the neighborhood is primarily a residential neighborhood.

References

See also
Abadir and Iraja

Neighbourhoods in Rio de Janeiro (city)